Robert Frank Redlich  (born 3 March 1946) is the commissioner of the Victorian Independent Broad-based Anti-corruption Commission (IBAC) and a former judge of the Supreme Court of Victoria's Court of Appeal. 

Justice Redlich was appointed to the trial division of the Supreme Court in 2002 and was elevated to the Court of Appeal in 2006.

On 1 January 2018, Justice Redlich commenced a five-year term as Commissioner of the Independent Broad-based Anti-corruption Commission.

References

1946 births
Living people
Judges of the Supreme Court of Victoria
Australian King's Counsel
Australian barristers
University of Melbourne alumni
Members of the Order of Australia